Lasthenes was a strategos (general) of the ancient Cretan city of Kydonia when the Romans attacked the city in 69 BC. In this era Kydonia had protected pirates and incurred the anger of the Roman Senate. When the Romans defeated Kydonia, Lasthenes' fellow strategos Panares surrendered the city, whilst Lasthenes fled to Knossos.

See also
Knossos

Line notes

References
 Appian of Alexandria and Horace White, The Roman History of Appian of Alexandria, 1899, The MacMillan Company
 C. Michael Hogan, Cydonia, The Modern Antiquarian, January 23, 2008 
 Theodor Mommsen, The History of Rome, Translator: William Purdie Dickson, 1894

1st-century BC Greek people
Ancient Cretan generals
Ancient Cydonians
Roman Crete

Ther is another Lasthenes, who is philosopher and friend of Dio Chrysostomus. He was a citizen of Apameia Myrleia. (Lucius Flavius Philostratos, Vita Apollonius (Life of Apollonius of Tyana), V.38)